Hewage Jayaweera (born 8 June 1976) was a Sri Lankan cricketer. He was a right-arm medium-pace bowler who played for Tamil Union Cricket and Athletic Club. He was born in Colombo.

Jayaweera made a single first-class appearance for the side, during the 1995–96 season, against Galle Cricket Club. From the lower order, he scored a single run in the only innings in which he batted.

He bowled seven overs in the match, taking figures of 2-46.

External links
Hewage Jayaweera at Cricket Archive 

1976 births
Living people
Sri Lankan cricketers
Tamil Union Cricket and Athletic Club cricketers